Lynch Station is an unincorporated community in Campbell County, Virginia. It is just north of the town of Altavista, focused around Route 626. Although technically in Campbell County, some areas in the southeastern part of neighboring Bedford County use Lynch Station as their address.

References 

Unincorporated communities in Campbell County, Virginia
Unincorporated communities in Virginia